Ezra Booth Taylor (July 9, 1823 – January 29, 1912) was an American lawyer and politician who served as a U.S. Representative from Ohio from 1880 to 1893. He won election to the congressional seat that had been vacated by James Garfield after he was elected president.

Biography
Taylor was born in Nelson Township, Portage County, Ohio and attended the common and select schools and academies. He studied law and was admitted to the bar and commenced practice in Portage County in 1845. Taylor was elected prosecuting attorney in 1854 and moved to Warren, Ohio, in 1861.

Civil War 
During the American Civil War, he enrolled as a private in Company A, One Hundred and Seventy-first Ohio Infantry, on April 27, 1864. He was mustered into service on May 5, 1864, and was honorably discharged on August 20, 1864.

Congress 
Taylor was elected judge of the court of common pleas for the ninth judicial district of Ohio and served from March 1877 to September 1880, when he resigned. Taylor was elected as a Republican to the Forty-sixth Congress to fill the vacancy caused by the resignation of James A. Garfield. He was re-elected to the Forty-seventh and the five succeeding Congresses and served from December 13, 1880, to March 3, 1893. 

He was an outspoken opponent of the Chinese Exclusion Act in 1882, arguing that Chinese immigrants were being singled out by laborers on the West Coast. He served as chairman of the Committee on the Judiciary (Fifty-first Congress) but declined to be a candidate for renomination in 1892.

Personal life 
After leaving office, he resumed the practice of his profession. He died in Warren, Ohio, on January 29, 1912, and was interred in the Warren mausoleum at Oakwood Cemetery.

In 1849, Taylor was married in Ravenna to Harriet M. Frazier, who died in 1876. They had a daughter and a son. The former, Harriet Taylor Upton was a famous suffragist and author.

References

 Retrieved on 2008-10-12

1823 births
1912 deaths
Politicians from Warren, Ohio
Union Army soldiers
People of Ohio in the American Civil War
Ohio lawyers
19th-century American politicians
19th-century American lawyers
Republican Party members of the United States House of Representatives from Ohio